James Cecil Parke (26 July 1881 – 27 February 1946) was an Irish rugby union player, tennis player, golfer, solicitor and World War I veteran. He became an Olympic silver medallist, Davis Cup champion, Wimbledon Mixed Doubles winner and Australasian Championships winner in both Singles and Doubles. He has often been referred to as Ireland's greatest ever sportsman.

Early life
James Parke was born in the town of Clones located in County Monaghan, Ireland. He was one of eight children to Emily (nee Pringle) and William Parke. When he was nine years old, Parke played for his hometown's chess team. He attended the Portora Royal School in Enniskillen and after graduation he attended Trinity college to study law. Having been a part of the Irish golf team in 1906, Parke was also considered a top-class track and field sprinter and a cricketer.

Rugby career
From 1901 to 1908, Parke played on the rugby teams of Monkstown, Dublin University. He also played on the provincial level for Leinster. Between 1903 and 1909, he also played in twenty games for the Irish national team. Parke captained Ireland on three occasions. He helped Ireland win two of their three 1906 Home Nations matches, resulting in a shared championship with Wales. In his final international cap, Parke kicked a penalty and a conversion to help seal a 19–8 victory in Ireland's first match against France.

Tennis career
As a tennis player, Parke was a baseliner whose best shot was a running down-the-line forehand. Through his career, Parke achieved a number of feats. Having already became the European singles champion in 1907, Parke later won a silver medal in the 1908 Olympics in men's doubles, the Australian men's singles and doubles tennis titles in 1912, and the Wimbledon mixed doubles title in 1914. He won eight Irish Lawn Tennis Singles titles, four doubles and two mixed titles. Parke was ranked world No. 4 in both 1913 and 1920 by A. Wallis Myers of The Daily Telegraph. He was described as having the strongest claim to the "championships of the world" by P.A. Vaile for the 1914 season.

Having already played in the Davis Cup (then known as the International Lawn Tennis Challenge), he defeated Norman Brookes and Rodney Heath in the Challenge Round on 28–30 November 1912, helping the British Isles capture the Cup in one of his greatest accomplishments. The following year he beat Maurice McLoughlin and Richard Norris Williams in the Challenge Round on 25–28 July 1913. However, the British Isles lost the meeting against the USA. Parke wore a four-leaved shamrock during every match he played.

Military
At the outset of World War 1, Parke enlisted in the Leinster Regiment (Royal Canadians) with the rank of captain (1914), before switching to the Essex regiment where he was promoted to Major in 1917. He was wounded twice, at Gallipoli and on the Western front.

Personal life
Parke married Sybil Smith in 1918 and moved to her hometown of Llandudno, Wales in 1920 where he joined Chamberlain and Johnson law practice. He died in Llandudno in 1946 following a heart attack.

Grand Slam finals

Singles: 1 title

Doubles: 2 (1 title, 1 runner-up)

Mixed doubles: 2 (1 title, 1 runner-up)

See also
 Frank Stoker

References

External links
 
 
 
 

1881 births
1946 deaths
Australasian Championships (tennis) champions
British male tennis players
Dublin University Football Club players
Ireland international rugby union players
Irish male golfers
Irish male tennis players
Irish rugby union players
Leinster Rugby players
Monkstown Football Club players
Olympic tennis players of Great Britain
Sportspeople from County Monaghan
Tennis players at the 1908 Summer Olympics
Wimbledon champions (pre-Open Era)
Olympic medalists in tennis
Olympic silver medallists for Great Britain
Grand Slam (tennis) champions in men's singles
Grand Slam (tennis) champions in mixed doubles
Grand Slam (tennis) champions in men's doubles
Medalists at the 1908 Summer Olympics
World number 1 ranked male tennis players
Rugby union players from County Monaghan
Rugby union centres